Building the Bridge is the fourteenth studio album by REO Speedwagon. It became the group's first non-charting album since 1972's R.E.O./T.W.O.. This is the only studio album by the band not in the ITunes Store, though the title track is available on The Essential REO Speedwagon.  The album was re-released on May 27, 2022 on Jimmy Buffett's Mailboat Records on CD, LP and digital.

The song "Building The Bridge" found its way to the White House, where President Clinton adopted it as the theme for his re-election campaign in 1996.

Track listing

Personnel 

REO Speedwagon
 Kevin Cronin – lead vocals (1-7, 9-11), backing vocals, acoustic guitar, electric guitar, rhythm guitar
 Dave Amato – lead guitar, rhythm guitar, slide guitar, backing vocals, harmony vocals 
 Neal Doughty – keyboards
 Bruce Hall – bass, acoustic guitar, backing vocals, lead vocals (8)
 Bryan Hitt – drums, percussion

Additional musicians
 Stephen Croes – Synclavier, orchestrations, string arrangements
 Mitch Zelezny – sequencing 
 Luis Conte – percussion 
 Dan Higgins – saxophones 
 Lew McCreary – trombone 
 Jerry Hey – trumpet 
 Carmen Twillie – backing vocals 
 Julia Waters – backing vocals 
 Maxine Waters Willard – backing vocals

Production 
 Kevin Cronin – producer, engineer, liner notes 
 Stephen Croes – producer 
 Greg Ladanyl – producer, engineer, mixing 
 Paris X – engineer 
 Brett Swain – engineer 
 Jeffrey Shannon – additional engineer, assistant engineer 
 Ron Lewter – mastering 
 Gavin Lurssen – mastering
 Doug Sax – mastering 
 Tim Wilson – technical advisor 
 Bobby Oberdorsten – guitar technician 
 Brian Ranks – guitar technician 
 Danny Shuss – drum technician, guitar technician
 Terry Wieland – guitar technician
 Omar Abderahman – production coordinator 
 Debbie Sommer – production coordinator 
 Martin Bambanian – art direction 
 George Abe – cover artwork 
 Breeze Munson – photography

References

REO Speedwagon albums
1996 albums
Albums produced by Greg Ladanyi